Dean Mathey (November 23, 1890 – April 16, 1972) was an American tennis player active in the early 20th century.  Namesake of Mathey College at Princeton University, he was raised in Cranford, New Jersey and was a member of the Cranford Golf Club (now called the Echo Lake Country Club).  He won the National Clay Court Tennis Doubles Championship twice.

Tennis career
Mathey reached the quarterfinals of the U.S. National Championships in 1910 and the final of the doubles in 1914. At the tournament in Cincinnati (now known as the Cincinnati Masters), he reached the semifinals in 1916 where he lost in four sets (2-6, 6-3, 3-6, 4-6) to William Johnston.

Grand Slam tournament performance timeline

References

External links 

American male tennis players
1890 births
1972 deaths
People from Cranford, New Jersey
Sportspeople from Union County, New Jersey
Tennis people from New Jersey
Princeton Tigers men's tennis players